3rd Naval Warfare Flotilla ( or 3. sjöstridsflj) of the Swedish Fleet  was founded in 2005 when the former minelayer and surface flotillas joined together. The flotilla's home base is in Karlskrona, Blekinge and is a part of the Karlskrona naval base. The flotilla mostly deploy ships in international missions today.

Organization
The flotilla is split into three different divisions.

31st Corvett Division
 patrol boat of Stockholm-class
 patrol boat of Stockholm-class
 corvette of Visby-class
 corvette of Visby-class
 corvette of Visby-class
3 patrol boats of the Tapper-class

33rd Minesweeper Division
2 minelayer ship of Koster-class.
1 ship of Spårö-class

34th Support Division

The former missile boat division was stationed in the flotilla until September 2005 when all the ships was decommissioned.

Heraldry and traditions

Coat of arms
The coat of arms of the 3rd Surface Attack Flotilla (Tredje ytattackflottiljen) 1997–1998 and 3rd Surface Warfare Flotilla (Tredje ytstridsflottiljen 1998–2004. Blazon: "Gules, a flash pointing down bendysinister argent, the first field charged with an erect crossbow and the second field with two triangles conjoined in pale, all or". The unit later adopted a new coat of arms.

Flag
The flag is a double swallow-tailed Swedish flag. It was presented to the then 3rd Surface Attack Flotilla by the Supreme Commander Owe Wiktorin at the Artillery Yard in Stockholm on 30 April 1996.

Commanding officers

1983–1984: Captain Lennart Grenstad 
1984–1985: Captain Lars Thomasson
1985–1988: Captain Frank Rosenius
1988–1989: Captain Torsten Lindh
1990–1993: Captain Sölve Larsby
1994–1997: Captain Magnus Waldenström
1997–1999: Captain Tommy Åsman
1999–2001: Captain Jörgen Ericsson
2001–2002: Captain Leif Nylander
2003–2005: Captain Anders Grenstad
2005–2008: Captain Erik Andersson
2008–2011: Captain Anders Olovsson
2012–2015: Captain Magnus Jönsson
2016–2018: Captain Bengt Lundgren
2018–2021: Per Edling
2021–20xx: Captain Jenny Ström

Names, designations and locations

Footnotes

References

Notes

Print

External links

 

Naval units and formations of Sweden
Military units and formations established in 1983
1983 establishments in Sweden
Karlskrona Garrison